Dolichamphilius longiceps is a species of loach catfish endemic to the Democratic Republic of the Congo where it is found in the Wagenia Rapids on the Lualaba River.  It reaches a length of 4.2 cm.

References 
 

Amphiliidae
Fish of Africa
Endemic fauna of the Democratic Republic of the Congo
Fish described in 2003